Applied engineering may refer to:

 Applied engineering (field), a professional field combining management, design, and technical skills 
 Applied Engineering, a hardware vendor for the Apple II series of computers